Under Attack may refer to:

 "Under Attack", a song by Swedish pop group ABBA
 Under Attack (The Alarm album), a song by Welsh band The Alarm (2006)
 "Under Attack", a song from the soundtrack of Danganronpa Another Episode: Ultra Despair Girls
 Under Attack (The Casualties album) (2006)
 Under Attack (Destruction album) (2016)